Maksym Vasylyovych Kutsyi (born 21 December 1982) is a Ukrainian entrepreneur and politician. He is a former Governor of Odesa Oblast. He assumed office on 11 October 2019 and was dismissed by President Volodymyr Zelensky on 5 November 2020.

Biography 
From 2000 to 2004, he studied law at the National Academy of Internal Affairs. He worked for the international audit company Baker Tilly. He also worked for Ernst & Young Global Limited. Kutsyi held senior positions at BTA Bank. Since 2015, he was the director of Service and Management LLC. Kutsyi is married and has a son.

References

External links 
 
 

1982 births
Living people
Politicians from Kyiv
Governors of Odesa Oblast
Independent politicians in Ukraine
21st-century Ukrainian lawyers
21st-century Ukrainian businesspeople
21st-century Ukrainian politicians